Stephen Ross (born 27 January 1965) is a Scottish retired football goalkeeper who made over 360 appearances in the Scottish League, most notably for Queen's Park. He also played for Stranraer, Clyde, Albion Rovers, Partick Thistle and Clydebank.

Honours 

Stranraer
 Scottish League Second Division: 1993–94

References

External links 

 

Scottish footballers
Scottish Football League players
Queen's Park F.C. players
Association football forwards
1965 births
Footballers from Glasgow
Clydebank F.C. (1965) players
Clyde F.C. players
Albion Rovers F.C. players
Partick Thistle F.C. players
Stranraer F.C. players
Camelon Juniors F.C. players
Living people
Scottish Junior Football Association players